Christian Alvart (born 28 May 1974 in Jugenheim) is a German filmmaker and screenwriter.

Prior to working in the film business Christian Alvart worked in various positions, most recently as a senior editor at Filmmagzin X-TRO. In 1999, he made his debut as a film director with the thriller Curiosity & the Cat, for which he also wrote the screenplay. His next film was the thriller Antibodies. Alvart's first English-language film was Case 39, followed by Pandorum. 

In March 2010, it was announced that Christian Alvart secured the film rights for Captain Future and is working on a live-action adaptation in 3D. Alvart confirmed in a 2017 interview that he was still working on the project.

Filmography
 Curiosity & the Cat (1999)
 Antibodies (2005)
 Pandorum (2009)
 Case 39 (2009)
 8 Uhr 28 (2010)
  (2013)
  (2015)
  (2016)
 Don't. Get. Out! (2018)
 Cut Off (2018)
 Dogs of Berlin (2018)
  (2019)
  (2020)

References

External links

1974 births
Mass media people from Hesse
Horror film directors
Living people
People from Darmstadt-Dieburg